Sprengelia distichophylla is a species of flowering plant in the heath family Ericaceae and is endemic to Tasmania. Flowering occurs in summer.

This species was first formally described in 1903 by Leonard Rodway who gave it the name Sprengelia incarnata var. distichophylla in The Tasmanian Flora. In 1963, Winifred Curtis raised the variety to species status as Sprengelia distichophylla in The Student's Flora of Tasmania. The specific epithet (distichophylla) means "having leaves in two rows".

This epacris grows in exposed in alpine scrub on the western mountains of Tasmania.

References

Epacridoideae
distichophylla
Ericales of Australia
Flora of Tasmania
Plants described in 1903